The coat of arms of Denmark has a lesser and a greater version.

The state coat of arms consists of three pale blue lions passant wearing crowns, accompanied by nine red lilypads (normally represented as heraldic hearts), all in a golden shield with the royal crown on top.

The national coat of arms of Denmark ( — also called ) is similar to the state coat of arms, but without the royal crown above the shield.

It is historically the coat of arms of the House of Estridsen, the dynasty which provided the kings of Denmark between 1047 and 1412. The current design was introduced in 1819, under Frederick VI. Previously, there had been no distinction between the "national" and the "royal" coat of arms. Since 1819, there has been a more complex royal coat of arms of Denmark separate from the national coat of arms.

History

The oldest known depiction of the insignia dates from a seal used by King Canute VI . The oldest documentation for the colours dates from c. 1270.

Historically, the lions faced the viewer and the number of hearts was not regulated and could be much higher.

The current design was adopted in 1819 during the reign of King Frederick VI who fixed the number of hearts to nine and decreed that the heraldic beasts were lions, consequently facing forward. 
A rare version exists from the reign of king Eric of Pomerania in which the three lions jointly hold the Danish banner, in a similar fashion as in the coat of arms of the former South Jutland County.
Until , Denmark used both a "small" and a "large" coat of arms, similar to the system still used in Sweden. The latter symbol held wide use within the government administration, e.g., by the Foreign Ministry. Since this time, the latter symbol has been classified as the coat of arms of the royal family, leaving Denmark with only one national coat of arms, used for all official purposes.

The crown on the shield is a heraldic construction based on the crown of King Christian V, not to be confused with the crown of King Christian IV. The main difference from the real crown is that the latter is covered with table cut diamonds rather than pearls. Both crowns, and other royal insignia, are located in Rosenborg Castle in Copenhagen.

The blazon in heraldic terms is: Or, three lions passant in pale azure crowned and armed Or langued gules, nine hearts Gules.

This insignia is almost identical to the coat of arms of Estonia and the greater coat of arms of Tallinn which can both be traced directly back to King Valdemar II and the Danish rule in northern Estonia in 1219–1346. The main differences are as follows: In the Danish coat of arms the lions are crowned, face forward, and accompanied by nine hearts. In the Estonian coat of arms, the "leopards" still face the viewer, they are not crowned, and no hearts are present. The coat of arms of Tallinn resembles the Estonian arms, but the leopards in the former arms are crowned with golden crowns similar to the ones in the Danish arms. It shows great similarities with the contemporary insignia of England's Richard the Lionheart and the current arms of the German state of Baden-Württemberg. The Danish coat of arms has also been the inspiration for the coat of arms of the former Duchy of Schleswig, a former Danish province (two blue lions in a golden shield). The hearts of the coat of arms also appear in the coat of arms of the German district of Lüneburg.

Royal Coat of Arms
The Royal Coat of Arms is more complex. The current version was established by royal decree 5 July 1972. It is much simpler than previous versions.

The first and fourth quarters represent Denmark by three crowned lions passant accompanied by nine hearts; the second quarter contains two lions passant representing Schleswig, a former Danish province now divided between Denmark and Germany; the third quarter contains a total of three symbols. The Three Crowns are officially interpreted as a symbol of the former Kalmar Union. The silver ram on blue represents the Faroe Islands and the similarly coloured polar bear represents Greenland.

The centre escutcheon, two red bars on a golden shield, represents the House of Oldenburg, the former royal dynasty that ruled Denmark and Norway from the middle of the fifteenth century. When the senior branch of this dynasty became extinct in 1863, the crown passed to Prince Christian of the cadet branch Glücksburg, whose descendants have reigned in Denmark ever since. The House of Glücksburg continues the use of the arms of the old Oldenburg dynasty, and the symbol is still officially referred to by its old association.

Two woodwoses act as supporters; this element can be traced back to the early reign of the Oldenburg dynasty. 
Similar supporters were used in the former arms of Prussia. The shield features the insignias of the Order of the Dannebrog and the Order of the Elephant around it.

The shield and supporters are framed by a royal ermine robe, surmounted by a royal crown.

A blazon in heraldic terms is: A shield quartered by a cross argent fimbriated gules, first and fourth quarter Or, three lions passant in pale azure crowned and armed Or langued gules, nine hearts gules (for Denmark); second quarter Or, two lions passant in pale azure armed Or langued gules (for Schleswig); third quarter azure, party per fess, in base per pale; in chief three crowns Or (for the Kalmar Union), in dexter base a ram passant argent armed and unguled Or (for the Faroe Islands), in sinister base a polar bear rampant argent (for Greenland). Overall an escutcheon Or two bars gules (for Oldenburg) the whole surrounded by the Collars of the Order of the Dannebrog and the Order of the Elephant. Supporters two woodwoses armed with clubs Proper standing on a pedestal. All surrounded by a mantle gules doubled ermine crowned with a royal crown and tied up with tasseled strings Or.

The royal coat of arms has since around 1960 been reserved exclusively for use by the Monarch, the royal family, the Royal Guards and the royal court according to royal decree. A select number of purveyors to the Danish royal family are also allowed to use the royal insignia.

Historical versions
In late medieval heraldry, coats of arms that used to be associated with noble families became attached to the territories that had been ruled by these families, and coats of arms used by individual rulers were composed of the coats of arms of the territories they ruled. In the case of Denmark, the coat of arms of the House of Estridsen with the extinction of the dynasty became the "coat of arms of Denmark". Olaf II of Denmark (and IV of Norway) succeeded his maternal grandfather Valdemar IV in 1376. He was the first king to rule Norway and Denmark in personal union. Olaf on his seal still displayed the Estridsen (for Denmark) and Sverre (for Norway) coats of arms in two separate shields. The custom of dividing the field arises with Eric of Pomerania at the end of the 14th century.

The modern "royal coat of arms of Denmark" is the continuation of this tradition of the Danish monarch using his or her personal coat of arms after the end of the personal union of Denmark and Norway.

The current version of the arms, established by royal decree 5 July 1972, is greatly simplified from the previous version which contained seven additional sub-coats representing five territories formerly ruled by the Danish kings and two medieval titles: Holstein, Stormarn, Dithmarschen, Lauenburg, Delmenhorst, and King of the Wends and Goths. 
A crowned silver stockfish on red was formerly included to represent Iceland, but due to Icelandic opposition, this symbol was replaced in 1903 by a silver falcon on blue. The falcon was in turn removed from the royal arms in 1948 following the death of King Christian X in 1947 and reflecting the 1944 breakup of the Dano-Icelandic union.

The following list is based on the research by Danish heraldist, Erling Svane. Danish names are shown in brackets.

 Norway: 1398 – : Gules, a lion rampant crowned and bearing an axe Or bladed argent. The union with Norway was dissolved in 1814 as a result of the Napoleonic Wars.
 Sweden: 1398 - Azure, three bars argent surmounted by a lion rampant Or. The Folkung lion, the arms of Sweden until 1364. Only used during the reign of Eric of Pomerania.
 Pomerania: 1398 - Argent, a griffin segreant gules. Only used during the reign of Eric of Pomerania.
 Bavaria: 1440 - Lozengy argent and azure. Only used during the reign of Christopher of Bavaria.
 Palatinate: 1440 - Sable, a lion rampant crowned Or. Only used during the reign of Christopher of Bavaria.
 King of the Wends ( / ): 1440–1972: Gules, a lindorm crowned Or. Early examples of this insignia also exist with a blue shield. Canute VI proclaimed himself  (King of Slavs). From the reign of Valdemar IV this title was known as King of the Wends. This symbol was later also interpreted as the coat of arms of Funen and appeared in the official insignia of the now-defunct army regiment . It should not be confused with the similar insignia of Bornholm, also formerly included in the Danish arms.
 King of the Goths ( / ): 1449–1972: Or, nine hearts 4, 3 and 2 Gules, in chief a lion passant Azure. Derived from the arms of Denmark and originally the arms of the Dukes of Halland. The lion is almost never crowned. This symbol was later also interpreted as the coat of arms of Jutland. It appears on the stern of the 19th century frigate Jylland and in the official insignia of the army regiment .
 Holstein: 1440–1972: Gules, a nettle leaf between three passion nails in pairle argent. Derived from the coat of arms of the counts of Schauenburg; a silver shield with a red indented bordure.
 Stormarn: 1496–1972: Gules, a swan argent gorged of a crown Or.
 Delmenhorst: 1531–1972: Azure, a cross pattée Or.
 Dithmarschen: 1563 - Gules, a knight armed cap-à-pie Or mounted on a horse argent and bearing a shield azure charged with a cross pattée Or. Frederick II conquered Dithmarschen in 1559.
 Iceland: 16th century – 1903: Gules, a stockfish argent ensigned by a crown Or. The symbol had been associated with Iceland from the early 16th century. First included in the arms of Frederick II. From 1903 to 1948 different arms were used, viz. Azure, a falcon argent. Iceland dissolved the union with Denmark in 1944, and following the death of King Christian X in 1947, the new King Frederick IX decided to remove the falcon from his arms. This change took place by royal decree on 6 July 1948.
 Gotland: Gules, a Holy Lamb argent. First included by King Frederick II. Last used during the reign of King Frederick VI.
 Saaremaa: from 1603, last used by King Frederick VI: Azure, an eagle displayed sable. Several historians have explained this violation of the heraldic rule of tincture as the black colour being the result of an oxidation of white paint containing lead.
 Fehmarn: from 1666, last used by King Frederick VI: Azure, a crown Or.
 Lauenburg: 1819–1972: Gules, a horse's head couped argent. Derived from the German  arms which shows a silver horse on red.

Versions and variants

Government
Various versions of the Danish Royal Arms are used by the Kingdom: Government, the Parliament and courts. The Kingdom Government and its agencies generally use a simplified version of the Royal Arms without the mantle, the pavilion and the topped royal crown. This simplified Royal Arms also feature on the cover of passports, embassies and consulates of the Kingdom of Denmark.

Other members of the Royal Family

Gallery

Elements currently used in the arms

Elements formerly used in the arms

Related symbols

 The coat of arms of Estonia and its capital, Tallinn
 The coat of arms of Schleswig (also represented in the coat of arms of Denmark's royal family)
 The coats of arms of the towns of Ribe, Varde, Halmstad and Ystad.
 The coat of arms of the former South Jutland County
 The coat of arms of the former North Jutland County
 The coat of arms of the German district of Lüneburg
 The coat of arms of Schleswig-Holstein
 The coats of arms of the German town of Dannenberg
 The personal arms of Prince Philip, Duke of Edinburgh contained the arms of Denmark in the first (upper left) quarter of the shield, and the sinister (left-side) supporter was based on the savage from the Danish arms. He used them on account of his descent from the Greek Schleswig-Holstein-Sonderburg-Glücksburg branch of the Danish House of Oldenburg.
 The Danish lion and hearts is featured in the Order of Saints George and Constantine and the Order of Saints Olga and Sophia, awarded by the Greek Royal Family.

See also

 Coat of arms of Greenland
 Coat of arms of the Faroe Islands
 Danish heraldry
 Royal Arms of England
 Flag of Denmark
 Coat of arms of Estonia
 Lion (heraldry)

References

External links
Danish National Archives - guide to the Danish coat of arms (Danish)
 It's All About Denmark - Denmark.dk

National symbols of Denmark
Denmark
Denmark
 
Denmark
Denmark
Denmark
Denmark
Denmark